The Fireman's Ball is a 1974 American TV movie.

Cast
Fred Grandy
Ted Knight

References

External links

1974 television films
1974 films
American television films